"You Are Everything" is the fourth single released from Dru Hill's second album, Enter the Dru.  The single reached number 84 on the Hot 100 and number 27 on the R&B/Hip Hop charts.  The remix, which features rapper Ja Rule, was released on Sisqó's solo album Unleash the Dragon.

Music video
The music video features the remix of the song with Ja Rule. It was directed by Martin Weisz. This was their first music video as a trio due to Woody leaving the group during the Wild Wild West video shoot to pursue Gospel music.

Track listing

Charts

References

1999 singles
1999 songs
Dru Hill songs
Island Records singles
Contemporary R&B ballads
Soul ballads